Stagecoach Merseyside is a major operator of bus services in the city of Liverpool and the surrounding Merseyside region. It is a sub-division of Stagecoach Merseyside and South Lancashire. 

Stagecoach Merseyside was formed in July 2005 with the acquisition of Glenvale Transport, which in turn had initially been formed by ex-MTL managers bidding for the company, following a Competition Commission ruling that Arriva Merseyside must sell their newly acquired Gillmoss depot to preserve competition between bus operators within the Merseyside area.

History

Glenvale Transport

The fleet of the newly created Glenvale Transport mostly comprised elderly Leyland Titans and aging Dennis Darts, although efforts were made to update the fleet via an agreement with Essex-based dealer Ensignbus, seeing newer buses arrive regularly from the end of 2003 right up to the Stagecoach takeover in the summer of 2005. Several much newer buses, although in need of repair, were permanently stationed at the depot. Glenvale had an annual turnover of approximately £25 million.

Stagecoach Merseyside
On numerous occasions Stagecoach made bids for some or all of the companies making up the former MTL Trust Holdings. In June 1998 MTL sold off MTL London but Stagecoach were outbid by the then independent Metroline. When MTL went bankrupt in January 2000 Stagecoach were very interested in acquiring the company but was again outbid this time by Arriva.

Apart from a Stagecoach Ribble/North West service between Southport and Preston and a Sunday only Lancashire County Council contract from Liverpool to Preston/Blackpool it seemed unlikely that Stagecoach would ever have significant operations on Merseyside. When rumours of a sale at Glenvale Transport surfaced around 2005 it was FirstGroup with its nearby operations First Chester & The Wirral and First Greater Manchester - which at the time had a school bus division in nearby Kirkby, the Go-Ahead Group and Transdev who at the time were bidding for Merseytravel's cancelled Merseytram scheme who seemed like the front runners to buy Glenvale Transport. However, on 13 July 2005, Glenvale Transport accepted a reported £3.4 million cash offer for the company from the Stagecoach Group who in turn agreed to absorb Glenvale's debt of approximately £7 million. Rebranded Stagecoach Merseyside, Glenvale Transport Limited was retained as the company's legal name and introduced 75 new low-floor Plaxton Pointer-bodied Dennis Dart buses to replace elderly step entrance buses.

In late January 2013 Stagecoach purchased First Chester & The Wirral bus operations in and these now operate as part of Stagecoach Merseyside.

Industrial Action
Industrial Action was intended to be undertaken in the Merseyside area by Stagecoach staff at their Gilmoss depot in July 2022 as a result of the UK cost of living crisis, however staff voted to accept an offer that the company had made.

Fleet

As of August 2015 the fleet consisted of 148 buses, which are operated from a single depot in Gillmoss.

References

External links

Stagecoach Merseyside official website

Stagecoach Group bus operators in England
Bus operators in Merseyside